Multiple people share the name George Augustus:
 George Augustus Eliott, 1st Baron Heathfield
 George Augustus Sala
 George Augustus Selwyn, bishop.
 George II of Great Britain was earlier known as Prince George Augustus
 George IV of the United Kingdom's full name was George Augustus Frederick